Annetta South is a town in Parker County, Texas, United States. The population was 526 at the 2010 census.

The town split from Annetta and incorporated in the 1980s, at which time it had a population of 115.

Geography

Annetta South is located at  (32.669494, –97.651389).

Demographics

2020 census

As of the 2020 United States census, there were 621 people, 207 households, and 183 families residing in the town.

2000 census
As of the census of 2000, there were 555 people, 189 households, and 164 families residing in the town. The population density was 291.7 people per square mile (112.8/km2). There were 198 housing units at an average density of 104.1 per square mile (40.2/km2). The racial makeup of the town was 96.58% White, 1.26% Native American, 0.18% Asian, 1.44% from other races, and 0.54% from two or more races. Hispanic or Latino of any race were 2.34% of the population.

There were 189 households, out of which 42.3% had children under the age of 18 living with them, 76.7% were married couples living together, 6.3% had a female householder with no husband present, and 12.7% were non-families. 9.0% of all households were made up of individuals, and 3.7% had someone living alone who was 65 years of age or older. The average household size was 2.94 and the average family size was 3.13.

In the town, the population was spread out, with 27.4% under the age of 18, 6.3% from 18 to 24, 25.9% from 25 to 44, 31.0% from 45 to 64, and 9.4% who were 65 years of age or older. The median age was 39 years. For every 100 females, there were 99.6 males. For every 100 females age 18 and over, there were 95.6 males.

The median income for a household in the town was $75,573, and the median income for a family was $77,368. Males had a median income of $51,719 versus $32,000 for females. The per capita income for the town was $28,715. About 1.2% of families and 1.9% of the population were below the poverty line, including 2.9% of those under age 18 and 5.5% of those age 65 or over.

Education

Public schools
The Town of Annetta South is served by the Aledo Independent School District.

Climate
The climate in this area is characterized by hot, humid summers and generally mild to cool winters.  According to the Köppen Climate Classification system, Annetta South has a humid subtropical climate, abbreviated "Cfa" on climate maps.

References

External links
 City of Annetta South

Dallas–Fort Worth metroplex
Towns in Parker County, Texas
Towns in Texas